David Parks Fackler (4 April 1841 – 30 October 1924) was an American actuary.

Fackler was born in Kempsville, Virginia, to parents David Morris Fackler and Susan Stith Satchell. He was raised in New York City and attended the City College of New York, graduating in 1859. Fackler worked Mutual Life Insurance Company of New York under Sheppard Homans Sr., resigning to become a consulting actuary. He was a founding member and second president of the Actuarial Society of America. In 1914, Fackler was named an inaugural fellow of the American Statistical Association. He died in Richmond, Virginia.

References

1841 births
1924 deaths
People from Virginia Beach, Virginia
People from New York City
City College of New York alumni
American actuaries
Fellows of the American Statistical Association
Mathematicians from New York (state)
Mathematicians from Virginia